An Nafud or Al-Nefud or The Nefud is a desert in the northern part of the Arabian Peninsula at , occupying a great oval depression.

The Nafud is an erg, a desert region located in north-central Saudi Arabia. It is noted for its sudden violent winds, which account for the large crescent-shaped dunes. The sand in the Nafud is a brick-reddish color. Rain comes once or twice a year. In some lowland areas, namely those near the Hejaz Mountains, there are oases where dates, vegetables, barley, and fruits are grown.

During the Arab Revolt in 1917, forces led by Auda ibu Tayi attacked the Turkish-held coastal town of Aqaba on its poorly defended eastern flank. The approach was via long and wide desert route, passing close to the edge of the Nafud. Col. T. E. Lawrence asked Auda ibu Tayi to allow their group to stray from their course into the Nafud. Auda refused, because it was unnecessary. Their harsh transit did not include entering the Nafud, as is depicted in the film Lawrence of Arabia.

The discovery of an 85,000-year-old fossilised human finger in An Nafud in 2016 by Dr Mathieu Duval of Griffith University provided the earliest evidence of modern humans outside Africa and the Levant.

References

Arabian Peninsula
Deserts of Saudi Arabia
Ergs